The 2016 SMP F4 Championship season is the second season of the SMP F4 Championship. It began on 29 April at Sochi and finished on 10 September at Ahvenisto after 20 races held across seven rounds.

This season saw the F4 debut of the Dutch team MP Motorsport, which joined Koiranen GP and SMP Racing in fielding cars and drivers. The series also expanded to the Netherlands, hosting some races as well as a parallel championship to the SMP F4 championship, called the Dutch F4 Trophy.

The series is a FIA North-European Zone (NEZ) championship as in 2015. NEZ Council agreed in its meeting in 20 March to allow KNAF licence holders to score points in the championship. The FIA World Motor Sport Council (WMSC) had already accepted KNAF into the NEZ F4 championship earlier in 4 March. The exception is valid for 2016 season only, and only after NEZ receives full payment of membership fees. Dutch drivers aren't eligible to any other NEZ cups or championships. Spanish Xavier Lloveras scored points in the series as he was an AKK Motorsports (FIN) license holder. Richard Verschoor take 11 wins as another Dutch driver Jarno Opmeer wins 7 races, as Thomas Tujula and Aleksandr Vartanyan win 1 race.

Drivers

Race calendar and results
The final calendar was announced on 7 March 2016.

Championship standings

Points are awarded to the top 10 classified finishers in each race. No points are awarded for pole position or fastest lap. At Sochi, only two races were held, and full points were awarded for Race 2.

Drivers' Championship

References

External links

SMP F4 Championship seasons
SMP F4 Championship
SMP F4 Championship
SMP F4
SMP F4